Tennyson Ward is a Brisbane City Council ward covering Tennyson, Chelmer, Corinda, Fairfield, Graceville, Sherwood, Yeerongpilly and Yeronga, and parts of Annerley and Oxley.

Councillors for Tennyson Ward

Results

References

City of Brisbane wards